Llywernog is a hamlet in the  community of Blaenrheidol, Ceredigion, Wales. Llywernog is represented in the Senedd by Elin Jones (Plaid Cymru) and the Member of Parliament is Ben Lake (Plaid Cymru).

Llywernog is home to Llywernog Mine, an 18th-century silver-lead mine.

See also
 Metal mining in Wales
 List of localities in Wales by population

References

Villages in Ceredigion